Shinkay District is a district of Zabul province in southern Afghanistan.

Demographics 
Shinkay has a population of about 22,900 as of 2013. It contains the town of Ẕāmi Kalay. The district is mostly populated by the Tokhi tribe of Ghilji Pashtuns.

Notable people 
 One of the multiple possible people associated with the identity of Wallace Fard Muhammad, the enigmatic founder of the Nation of Islam, claimed on a World War I draft card to be a native of "Shinka" in Afghanistan.

See also 
Districts of Afghanistan

References 

Districts of Zabul Province